Marimutha Pillai  (1712 – 1787 CE) was a composer of Carnatic music and, along with Arunachala Kavi and Muthu Thandavar, was one of the pioneering Tamil Trinity of Carnatic music. He was a contemporary of Arunachala Kavi.

His most popular compositions are Orukal Sivachidambaram (Arabhi) and Kalai tookki (Yadukulakambhoji).

See also 

List of Carnatic composers

References

Carnatic composers
1712 births
1787 deaths
18th-century composers
18th-century male musicians